Middle Fork Township may refer to the following townships in the United States:

Iowa 
 Middle Fork Township, Ringgold County, Iowa

North Carolina 
 Middle Fork Township, Forsyth County, North Carolina
 Middle Fork I Township, Forsyth County, North Carolina
 Middle Fork II Township, Forsyth County, North Carolina